Tale of a Dog is a 1944 Our Gang short comedy film directed by Cyril Endfield.  It was the 219th Our Gang short to be released, and the penultimate film in the series. Tale of a Dog was sold to theaters by Metro-Goldwyn-Mayer not as an Our Gang comedy but as part of its MGM Miniatures variety series.

Plot
Buckwheat finds his friend Big Shot Jones moping about the train yard: it seems that Big Shot's father has ordered him to get rid of his dog. Instead of taking the dog to the pound, Big Shot intends to have him stow away on a train to Alabama. Buckwheat instead talks Big Shot into letting the gang adopt the dog, whom they name "Smallpox" (opting for a more interesting name for the spotted dog than "Spot"). However, when Froggy, Mickey, and Janet overhear Buckwheat and Big Shot's plans to "surprise them with S/smallpox," they fear the worst and call all their friends and the Greenpoint Board of Health. A panic grips the small town, with the gang's parents worried about their whereabouts and well-being, and the rest of the neighborhood kids running away from Buckwheat and Big Shot wherever they turn up.

Buckwheat and Big Shot are isolated (a term Buckwheat's mother misunderstands, resulting in her putting her child literally "on ice"), but when a doctor learns from Buckwheat that "Smallpox" refers to a dog, not the disease, the smallpox scare is declared a hoax. The mayor of Greenpoint lectures Froggy, Mickey, and Janet in spreading unsubstantiated rumors and sends them on their way. The gang agrees to adopt Smallpox...but make sure to change his name to "Spotty." Upon hearing the gang promise to feed him, Smallpox/Spotty turns to the camera and (via mouth animation) tells the audience (in a stereotypical southern African American dialect) "My, oh my; that shol' is good news!"

Cast

The Gang
Bobby Blake as Mickey Blake
Janet Burston as Janet
Billy Laughlin as Froggy Laughlin
Billie Thomas as Buckwheat Thomas

Additional cast
Cordell Hickman as Big Shot Jones
Dickie Hall as Little kid
Frank Ward as Kid grabbing Dickie
Margaret Bert as Gossiper on phone
Anita Bolster as Gossiper
Willa Pearl Curtis as Buckwheat's mother
Fern Emmett as Gossiper deciding to call the newspapers
Emmett Vogan as Dr. Parkson
Dorothy Newmann as Gossiper

Notes
Dancing Romeo, released the same month as Tale of a Dog, was the last Our Gang comedy to be filmed and released. However, pre-production began on Dancing Romeo first, making Tale of a Dog the final film in the series to go into production. The final three films in the series were all directed by Cyril Endfield in late 1943, and released in April 1944.

Tale of a Dog was the only Our Gang film completed for the 1943-44 film season. Issuing the short under the MGM Miniatures banner resulted in it being the only one of the last five Our Gang shorts to make a profit, according to financial data prepared by MGM in 1956.

See also
 Our Gang filmography

References

External links
 

1944 films
American black-and-white films
Metro-Goldwyn-Mayer short films
1944 comedy films
Films directed by Cy Endfield
Our Gang films
1940s American films